Fairview is an unincorporated community in Oscoda County in the U.S. state of Michigan.

Fairview is considered the wild turkey capital of Michigan.  The Fairview 48621 ZIP Code serves most of Comins Township, as well as small portions of Clinton Township to the north and Mentor Township to the south.

Geography

Geographic features
Fairview is situated near the Au Sable River Valley.
It is surrounded by the Huron National Forest and near the Rifle River State Recreation Area.
The area is part of the Au Sable State Forest, specifically the
 Grayling FMU (Alcona, Crawford, Oscoda, and northern Iosco counties).
The Oscoda County Park is minutes away.
Fairview is part of Northern Michigan.
Fairview sits on the "Grayling outwash plain", a unique habitat.  Glaciers shaped the area, creating a unique regional ecosystem.  A large portion of the area is the so-called Grayling outwash plain, which consists of broad outwash plain including sandy ice-disintegration ridges; jack pine barrens, some white pine-red pine forest, and northern hardwood forest. Large lakes were created by glacial action.

Highways
  runs mostly concurrent with M-72 before separating north in the center of the community, where it is known locally as North Abbe Road.
  runs eastwest through the center of the community and merges briefly with M-33.  Locally, it is referred to as East Miller Road.

Local attractions and activities

Attractions
The community is centered in the Huron National Forest along the Au Sable River.  Wildlife are nearby, including bear, deer, eagles, Kirtland's warblers, and turkeys.  Local attractions and activities include:
Amish Community
Fairview Pines golf club
Mennonite Relief Expo & Fair
Michigan Shore to Shore Riding & Hiking Trail passes nearby.  It runs from Empire to Oscoda, and points north and south.  It is a 500-mile interconnected system of trails.
Steiner's Museum of pioneer artifacts is in Fairview.
The Michigan AuSable Valley Railroad is located in Fairview.  It is a ¼ scale,  gauge ridable miniature railway, which offers rides on a passenger train through  of jack pine country. Riders travel through parts of the Huron National Forest, often with Kirtland's Warblers visible. The roadbed, built by Diane and Howard Schrader, includes two trestles and a tunnel, and took almost ten years to build. The train station is the home of Schrader's Railroad Catalog, also run by the Schraders.
Cedar Valley Wild Frontier Park and Golf Course is a good attraction to visit in Fairview, Michigan. It is designed to make guests feel like they are in “pure” northern Michigan. Since its existence, it has been a family operated business. The Cedar Valley Golf Course attracts older people and younger people. The public course consists of 18 holes full of sand traps and ponds. A simulator is also available during the winter months.  On the property there is also an amusement park and a campground as well. The amusement park has 18 rides, plus a miniature golf course and batting cages. A picnic table area is also available for visitors. Visitors can also plan parties or group visitations.

Activities
Birding - Kirtland Warbler Habitat and Festival.  The Kirtland's warbler has its habitat in the area.  There is a Kirtland's Warbler Festival, which is sponsored in part by Kirtland Community College.
Boating, paddling (canoe and kayak)
Fishing, particularly trout fishing
Hiking
Golf
Hunting
Cross-country skiing
ORV, motorcycle and groomed snowmobile trails, including the renowned Bull Gap.
Every year, Fairview Area Schools puts on Eagle Festival.  This festival is in the second week of October, and is a fundraiser for Fairview School's athletic department.  The festival includes a parade, soccer games, a silent auction, car shows, kiddie games and more.

References

Notes

Citations

Sources
Howard and Joann Schrader Dunn, Jon, and Garrett, Kimball. Warblers. New York: Houghton Mifflin, 1997. Print.
USDA, Forest Service Huron-Manistee National Forests. Biological Opinion Monitoring2006.

External links
Fairview Community Schools
Michigan Organizations, Oscoda County Chamber of Commerce. 

Unincorporated communities in Oscoda County, Michigan
Unincorporated communities in Michigan